Robert Moore (born February 12, 1949) is a former American football tight end, who played eight seasons in the National Football League. He played college football at Stanford University.

References

External links
College stats

1949 births
Living people
American football tight ends
Stanford Cardinal football players
Oakland Raiders players
Tampa Bay Buccaneers players
Denver Broncos players
Players of American football from Baltimore